Wallowa High School is a public high school in Wallowa, Oregon, United States.

Academics
In 2008, 100% of the school's seniors received a high school diploma. Of 20 students, 20 graduated and none dropped out.

Notable alumni
 Amos Marsh, football player with the Dallas Cowboys
 Frank Wayne Marsh, football player with the San Diego Chargers

See also
 List of high schools in Oregon

References

High schools in Wallowa County, Oregon
Public middle schools in Oregon
Public high schools in Oregon